Laurel Airport  is an airport serving the village of Laurel in Puntarenas Province, Costa Rica. The airport is among palm oil plantations, near the border with Panama.

Facilities 
There are hangars on the threshold of runway 11 that support aerial spraying and ultralight aircraft. The runway is on the southwest edge of the village.

See also 

Transport in Costa Rica
List of airports in Costa Rica

References

External links 

DGAC list of Costa Rica airports

Airports in Costa Rica
Buildings and structures in Puntarenas Province